Luz María Puente (20 November 1923 – 23 February 2021) was an American born Mexican pianist.

Her son  is also a pianist. Puente died on 23 February 2021, aged 97.

In 2008 the Mexico City Chamber Orchestra paid tribute to her during a concert for her career as a soloist and teacher of several generations of pianists. On 26 January 2015, the National Council for Culture and the Arts and the Academia Medalla Mozart A.C. awarded Puente the Medal in the Merit Category, along with Gallya Dubrova, Natia Stankivitch and Virgilio Valle. In September 2017 she received the Bellas Artes medal.

References

1923 births
2021 deaths
Mexican pianists
Mexican women pianists
People from Los Angeles
Place of death missing
American emigrants to Mexico